The Dallara T05 is an open-wheel formula racing car, designed, developed and made by Italian manufacturer Dallara, that competed in the one-make World Series by Renault spec-series, from 2005-2007. The car debuted at the Belgian Circuit Zolder in 2005.

References

External links
Dallara Official Website

Formula Renault 3.5 series
Open wheel racing cars
T05